The Battle of Dinboz or Dimbos(Turkish: Dimbos Muharebesi) was a battle between the Ottoman Beylik (later Ottoman Empire) and the Byzantine Empire in 1303.

Background 
After the battle of Bapheus in 1302, Turkish gazis from all parts of Anatolia began raiding Byzantine territories. Byzantine emperor Andronikos II Palaiologos tried to form an alliance with the Ilkhanid Mongols against the Ottoman threat. Failing to secure frontiers by the alliance he decided to attack the Ottomans with his own army.

The battle 
The battle is known only through later traditions which include semi-legendary elements, and hence probably reflects more folk tradition than actual historical events. According to Theodore Spandounes, "Dimbos" (in Greek) or "Dinboz" (deriving from din bozmak, "change of faith") was the first Byzantine town to fall to the Ottomans. The 15th-century chronicler Aşıkpaşazade drew on accounts of another battle near Koyunhisar (Battle of Bapheus) from other chronicles and moved them to the vicinity Dimbos to form his account of the "Battle of Dinboz".

The Anatolian army of the Byzantine Empire was composed of the forces of local garrisons like Adranos (modern Orhaneli), Bidnos, Kestel (modern village Erdoğan) and Kete (modern village of Ürünlü). In the spring of 1303, the Byzantine army advanced to Yenişehir, an important Ottoman city north east of Bursa. Osman I defeated them near the pass of Dimbos on the way to Yenişehir. During the battle both sides suffered heavy casualties. On the Ottoman side, Osman's nephew Aydoğdu and on the Byzantine side the governors of Kestel and Dimbos were among the losses.

Aftermath 
The governor of Kete tried to escape to nearby Lopardion (modern Ulubat) fort. But Osman arrested and later executed him in front of the fort; the fort subsequently surrendered and was captured by the Ottoman Turks.

References 

1300s in the Byzantine Empire
Dimbos
Dimbos
Dimbos
Dimbos
History of Bursa Province
Dimbos
1303 in the Ottoman Empire